Menke is a German surname. Notable people with the surname include:

 Bill Menke, American basketball player
 Denis Menke (1940–2020), American baseball player
 Frank G. Menke (1885–1954), American newspaper reporter
 Frl. Menke aka Franziska Menke (born 1960), German singer
 Heinrich Theodor Menke (1819–1892) German geographer
 Karl Menke (Carl Menke) (born 1906, date of death unknown), German field hockey player
 Karl Theodor Menke (1791–1861), German malacologist
 Richard J. Menke (1935-2006), American lawyer and politician
 Sally Menke (1953–2010), American film editor
 Sebastian Menke (Sebastian G. Menke) (1910–2002), the 10th president of St. Ambrose University in Davenport, Iowa. Menke Observatory in Dixon, Iowa (USA) is named after him

See also
 Menkes 
 Menke condition nitration method discovered by a Dutch chemist
 Retainers in early China (social group), also known as menke

German-language surnames
Jewish surnames